Nanmadaw Me Nu (18 June 1783 – 12 May 1840), commonly known by her regnal title Thiri Pavara Mahayazeinda Yadana Dewi was the chief queen of King Bagyidaw of the Konbaung dynasty of Burma from 1819 to 1837. She married Bagyidaw when he was Prince of Sagaing, then became chief queen consort when he ascended to the throne on 5 June 1819, gaining the title Namadaw Mibaya Khaunggyi (lit. Queen of the Main Palace).

King Bagyidaw was obviously under the dominance of the queen. Me Nu came to power and manipulated not only the royal court affairs but also the political affairs of the country. Although the former king and queen did not sit together on the throne, Me Nu broke the tradition and sat on the throne together. Me Nu was later sentenced to death when Bagyidaw's brother, Tharrawaddy Min, usurped him.

Background 

Me Nu was born Shin Min Nu on 18 June 1783 at Phalangon Village, 5 miles northwest of present-day Khin-U. She was the great-granddaughter of the hero Bala Thaman. He founded the village during the reign of King Mahadhammaraza Dipadi of the Nyaungyan dynasty, who assigned him to the local fort to help guard against the Manipuris. She had an elder brother, Maung O. Her father, Thiha Kyawswa U Hlote, was a son of Thakhin Mun, who was the third daughter of Bala Thaman, and her mother, Daw Nge, was a Phalangon villager.

Selection as crown princess
During the reign of King Bodawpaya, a falcon took 11-year-old Me Nu's sarong as she was bathing, dropping the garment in the left wing of the southern royal palace. When the king searched for the owner of the sarong, she soon arrived in his presence. After royal officials had conducted an investigation, the king offered her a position as lady-in-waiting at the palace.

Prince Sagaing became crown prince on 6 April 1809. At the end of 1812 his consort, Hsinbyume, gave birth to Prince Nyaungyan, but died seven days later. Prince Sagaing married Me Nu in 1813 and she became crown princess. This granted her the rights to nine villages (five of them salt farms), thirty horses, 3,000 pei of land, and the taxes from four kinds of products. She also granted the appanage of Taungoo.

Chief queen
Prince Sagaing became the seventh king of the Konbaung dynasty, on 7 June 1819, making Me Nu his chief queen and given the title of Thiri Pavara Mahayazeinda Yadana Dewi. Her husband also given the title of "Thadoe Minhla Kyawhtin" and granted the appanage of Salin to her brother, Maung O.

Me Nu had three children with Bagyidaw. Their eldest daughter died at young and their son, the Prince of Palaing, died in April 1804 at age 10 due to chickenpox. Their remaining daughter, Princess Supayagale, became Queen Hsinbyumashin; she was the wife of King Mindon and mother of Burma's last queen, Supayalat.

Increasing power and downfall
Bagyidaw favored Me Nu, she rise to power in the court. Together with the king, she sat on the throne and arranged the court affairs. Alongside her brother and General Maha Bandula, she advocated for war with the British.

General Maha Bandula died in Danubyu, and the British troops occupied the Yandabo, 40 miles from the royal capital. The Treaty of Yandabo was signed on 24 February 1826 which ended the First Anglo-Burmese War (1824–1826). Due to the defeat of the war, 1 billion Burmese kyats of compensation had to be paid. Lacking money, Me Nu sold her jewelries and paid the first installment of compensation.

After the disastrous First Anglo-Burmese War (1824–1826) left the country crippled, Bagyidaw became increasingly reclusive, afflicted by bouts of depression and could not handle the administration of the state. Me Nu and Maung O became the de facto rulers of the country, and they were much feared due to their tyrannical policies.

In February 1837, Crown Prince Tharrawaddy, brother of Bagyidaw, raised a rebellion. By April he had forced Bagyidaw to abdicate in his favor. Tharrawaddy put his brother under house arrest and sentenced to death Me Nu and her brother.

As her last wish, she wants to see Sayadaw U Bok one last time. When she saw the sayadaw, she says,

While the abbot was reading, he turned to Me Nu and says,

Satisfied with the sermon, Me Nu happily went to the place of execution.

Donations
Me Nu established the Me Nu Oak-kyaung (Brick Monastery) in 1822 for the royal abbot Nyaunggan Sayadaw U Po. It was then offered to the second Nyaunggan Sayadaw U Bok. The monastery was damaged by the earthquake of 1838 but repaired in 1873 by Hsinbyumashin. The monastery is a fine specimen of the Konbaung period of architecture. It consists of a series of wooden monasteries with multiple roofs and a prayer hall with a seven-tiered superstructure.

Some of her donations are as follow,

Maha Meru Makuṭa Jhaṇḍa Rājā Bell at Pahtodawgyi
Maha Aungmye Bonzan Monastery
Maha Zeya Pahta Brick Bridge in Inwa
Phalangon Pagoda

References

Bibliography
 

Chief queens consort of Konbaung dynasty
1783 births
1840 deaths
People executed by drowning
Burmese Buddhists
19th-century Burmese women
18th-century Burmese women